The enzyme diaminobutyrate decarboxylase catalyzes the chemical reaction

L-2,4-diaminobutanoate  propane-1,3-diamine + CO2

This enzyme belongs to the family of lyases, specifically the carboxy-lyases, which cleave carbon-carbon bonds.  The systematic name of this enzyme class is L-2,4-diaminobutanoate carboxy-lyase (propane-1,3-diamine-forming). Other names in common use include DABA DC, L-2,4-diaminobutyrate decarboxylase, and L-2,4-diaminobutanoate carboxy-lyase.

References

 
 
 

EC 4.1.1
Enzymes of unknown structure